HMS Radiant was an  which fought in the First World War as part of the Royal Navy before being transferred to the Royal Thai Navy, in which she served until well after the Second World War.

Royal Navy service
She was built by John I. Thornycroft & Company at Woolston and launched 25 November 1916. Radiant served with the 10th Destroyer Flotilla of Harwich Force from April 1917 until February 1919. During the night of 23 December 1917, while escorting of a convoy off the coast of Holland, she came to the rescue of the Harwich Force destroyers ,  and  after the destroyers ran into a German minefield. Torrent struck a mine, and when attempting a rescue, Surprise and Tornado also hit mines, resulting in the three destroyers being lost. Radiant picked up all survivors that could be found. This accounted for twelve officers and sailors, with the losses of 252 officers and men from the three destroyers.

After the First World War, she was briefly assigned to the 4th Destroyer Flotilla of the Home Fleet before paying off and being laid up in reserve as part of the Nore Command until sold.

Thai Navy service
She was sold back to Thornycroft on 21 June 1920, who then sold her on to the Royal Thai Navy in September 1920. She was renamed HTMS Phra Ruang. It is believed that in order to finance her acquisition King Rama VI and other senior figures donated personally to the finance fund, making this the first publication donation of money to procure a warship in Thailand. The Royal Prince Admiral Abhakara Kiartivongse went to England to negotiate the purchase personally and command the ship during its subsequent voyage from England to Thailand.

On 29 January 1943, the submarine  launched three torpedoes at a destroyer believed to be Phra Ruang and watched each run true to the target. However, all proved to be duds.

Because of her continued service in the Thai Navy, the destroyer was the last survivor of the Royal Navy's First World War destroyers. She was used as a training ship toward the end of her career, removed from the effective list in 1957, and stricken in 1959.

Notes

References

Bibliography

 
 
 
 

 

World War I destroyers of the United Kingdom
R-class destroyers (1916)
1917 ships
Ships of the Royal Thai Navy
Ships built by John I. Thornycroft & Company
Thailand–United Kingdom military relations